Kuntur Wasi (Quechua kuntur condor, wasi rock, "condor house", also spelled Condorhuasi) is a mountain in the northern part of the Cordillera Blanca in the Andes of Peru which reaches a height of approximately . It is located in the Ancash Region, Corongo Province, Cusca District, and in the Sihuas Province, San Juan District.

Sources

Mountains of Peru
Mountains of Ancash Region